David Miller is a British writer and journalist based in Wimbledon, London.

Journalism
David Miller has contributed to many publications including the magazines Film Review, TV Zone and Starburst (where his work includes interviews with Sir Ian McKellen, Tom Baker and Ray Harryhausen).

Until 2007 he was editor of the UK-based horror genre magazine Shivers. He then became editor for the last few issues of The Poirot Collection, a partwork which presented the Agatha Christie's Poirot television episodes. He is currently editor of The Agatha Christie Collection partwork for Chorion, which brings together and presents the newer episodes of Poirot and Marple; the 1983 series Partners in Crime, and Agatha Christie film adaptations such as the Margaret Rutherford Miss Marple films and the all-star adaptations of The Mirror Crack'd, and Murder On The Orient Express.

Books
David Miller co-wrote the book They Came From Outer Space! with Mark Gatiss (of The League of Gentlemen), and is author of The Complete Peter Cushing; an overview of the life and works of the actor Peter Cushing. This was originally published as The Peter Cushing Companion.

Bibliography

Non-Fiction 

 The Complete Peter Cushing (original title: The Peter Cushing Companion)()
 They Came From Outer Space!: Alien Encounters In The Movies (with Mark Gatiss)

British magazine editors
Living people
Year of birth missing (living people)